LTE Advanced (LTE+) is a mobile communication standard and a major enhancement of the Long Term Evolution (LTE) standard. It was formally submitted as a candidate 4G to ITU-T in late 2009 as meeting the requirements of the IMT-Advanced standard, and was standardized by the 3rd Generation Partnership Project (3GPP) in March 2011 as 3GPP Release 10.

The LTE+ format was first proposed by NTT DoCoMo of Japan and has been adopted as the international standard. LTE standardization has matured to a state where changes in the specification are limited to corrections and bug fixes. The first commercial services were launched in Sweden and Norway in December 2009 followed by the United States and Japan in 2010. More LTE networks were deployed globally during 2010 as a natural evolution of several 2G and 3G systems, including Global system for mobile communications (GSM) and Universal Mobile Telecommunications System (UMTS) in the 3GPP family as well as CDMA2000 in the 3GPP2 family.

The work by 3GPP to define a 4G candidate radio interface technology started in Release 9 with the study phase for LTE-Advanced. Being described as a 3.9G (beyond 3G but pre-4G), the first release of LTE did not meet the requirements for 4G (also called IMT Advanced as defined by the International Telecommunication Union) such as peak data rates up to 1 Gb/s. The ITU has invited the submission of candidate Radio Interface Technologies (RITs) following their requirements in a circular letter, 3GPP Technical Report (TR) 36.913, "Requirements for Further Advancements for E-UTRA (LTE-Advanced)." These are based on ITU's requirements for 4G and on operators’ own requirements for advanced LTE.
Major technical considerations include the following:

 Continual improvement to the LTE radio technology and architecture
 Scenarios and performance requirements for working with legacy radio technologies
 Backward compatibility of LTE-Advanced with LTE. An LTE terminal should be able to work in an LTE-Advanced network and vice versa. Any exceptions will be considered by 3GPP.
 Consideration of recent World Radiocommunication Conference (WRC-07) decisions regarding frequency bands to ensure that LTE-Advanced accommodates the geographically available spectrum for channels above 20 MHz. Also, specifications must recognize those parts of the world in which wideband channels are not available.

Likewise, 'WiMAX 2', 802.16m, has been approved by ITU as the IMT Advanced family. WiMAX 2 is designed to be backward compatible with WiMAX 1 devices. Most vendors now support conversion of 'pre-4G', pre-advanced versions and some support software upgrades of base station equipment from 3G.

The mobile communication industry and standards organizations have therefore started work on 4G access technologies, such as LTE Advanced. At a workshop in April 2008 in China, 3GPP agreed the plans for work on Long Term Evolution (LTE). A first set of specifications were approved in June 2008. Besides the peak data rate 1 Gb/s as defined by the ITU-R, it also targets faster switching between power states and improved performance at the cell edge. Detailed proposals are being studied within the working groups.

Three technologies from the LTE-Advanced tool-kit carrier aggregation, 4x4 MIMO and 256QAM modulation in the downlink if used together and with sufficient aggregated bandwidth, can deliver maximum peak downlink speeds approaching, or even exceeding, 1 Gbit/s. Such networks are often described as ‘Gigabit LTE networks’ mirroring a term that is also used in the fixed broadband industry.

Proposals 
The target of 3GPP LTE Advanced is to reach and surpass the ITU requirements. LTE Advanced should be compatible with first release LTE equipment, and should share frequency bands with first release LTE. In the feasibility study for LTE Advanced, 3GPP determined that LTE Advanced would meet the ITU-R requirements for 4G. The results of the study are published in 3GPP Technical Report (TR) 36.912.

One of the important LTE Advanced benefits is the ability to take advantage of advanced topology networks; optimized heterogeneous networks with a mix of macrocells with low power nodes such as picocells, femtocells and new relay nodes. The next significant performance leap in wireless networks will come from making the most of topology, and brings the network closer to the user by adding many of these low power nodes LTE Advanced further improves the capacity and coverage, and ensures user fairness. LTE Advanced also introduces multicarrier to be able to use ultra wide bandwidth, up to 100 MHz of spectrum supporting very high data rates.

In the research phase many proposals have been studied as candidates for LTE Advanced (LTE-A) technologies. The proposals could roughly be categorized into:

 Support for relay node base stations
 Coordinated multipoint (CoMP) transmission and reception
 UE Dual TX antenna solutions for SU-MIMO and diversity MIMO, commonly referred to as 2x2 MIMO
 Scalable system bandwidth exceeding 20 MHz, up to 100 MHz
 Carrier aggregation of contiguous and non-contiguous spectrum allocations
 Local area optimization of air interface
 Nomadic / Local Area network and mobility solutions
 Flexible spectrum usage
 Cognitive radio
 Automatic and autonomous network configuration and operation
 Support of autonomous network and device test, measurement tied to network management and optimization
 Enhanced precoding and forward error correction
 Interference management and suppression
 Asymmetric bandwidth assignment for FDD
 Hybrid OFDMA and SC-FDMA in uplink
 UL/DL inter eNB coordinated MIMO
 SONs, Self Organizing Networks methodologies

Within the range of system development, LTE-Advanced and WiMAX 2 can use up to 8x8 MIMO and 128-QAM in downlink direction. Example performance: 100 MHz aggregated bandwidth, LTE-Advanced provides almost 3.3 Gbit peak download rates per sector of the base station under ideal conditions. Advanced network architectures combined with distributed and collaborative smart antenna technologies provide several years road map of commercial enhancements.

The 3GPP standards Release 12 added support for 256-QAM.

A summary of a study carried out in 3GPP can be found in TR36.912.

Timeframe and introduction of additional features 

Original standardization work for LTE-Advanced was done as part of 3GPP Release 10, which was frozen in April 2011. Trials were based on pre-release equipment. Major vendors support software upgrades to later versions and ongoing improvements.

In order to improve the quality of service for users in hotspots and on cell edges, heterogenous networks (HetNet) are formed of a mixture of macro-, pico- and femto base stations serving corresponding-size areas. Frozen in December 2012, 3GPP Release 11 concentrates on better support of HetNet. Coordinated Multi-Point operation (CoMP) is a key feature of Release 11 in order to support such network structures. Whereas users located at a cell edge in homogenous networks suffer from decreasing signal strength compounded by neighbor cell interference, CoMP is designed to enable use of a neighboring cell to also transmit the same signal as the serving cell, enhancing quality of service on the perimeter of a serving cell. In-device Co-existence (IDC) is another topic addressed in Release 11. IDC features are designed to ameliorate disturbances within the user equipment caused between LTE/LTE-A and the various other radio subsystems such as WiFi, Bluetooth, and the GPS receiver. Further enhancements for MIMO such as 4x4 configuration for the uplink were standardized.

The higher number of cells in HetNet results in user equipment changing the serving cell more frequently when in motion.
The ongoing work on LTE-Advanced in Release 12, amongst other areas, concentrates on addressing issues that come about when users move through HetNet, such as frequent hand-overs between cells. It also included use of 256-QAM.

First technology demonstrations and field trials 
This list covers technology demonstrations and field trials up to the year 2014, paving the way for a wider commercial deployment of the VoLTE technology worldwide. From 2014 onwards various further operators trialled and demonstrated the technology for future deployment on their respective networks. These are not covered here. Instead a coverage of commercial deployments can be found in the section below.

Deployment 
The deployment of LTE-Advanced in progress in various LTE networks.

In August 2019, the Global mobile Suppliers Association (GSA) reported that there were 304 commercially launched LTE-Advanced networks in 134 countries. Overall, 335 operators are investing in LTE-Advanced (in the form of tests, trials, deployments or commercial service provision) in 141 countries.

LTE Advanced Pro 

LTE Advanced Pro (LTE-A Pro, also known as 4.5G, 4.5G Pro, 4.9G, Pre-5G, 5G Project) is a name for 3GPP release 13 and 14. It is an evolution of LTE Advanced (LTE-A) cellular standard supporting data rates in excess of 3 Gbit/s using 32-carrier aggregation. It also introduces the concept of License Assisted Access, which allows sharing of licensed and unlicensed spectrum.

Additionally, it incorporates several new technologies associated with 5G, such as 256-QAM, Massive MIMO, LTE-Unlicensed and LTE IoT, that facilitated early migration of existing networks to enhancements promised with the full 5G standard.

See also 
 E-UTRA
 LTE User Equipment Category
 Simulation of LTE Networks
 4G
 5G

Bibliography 
 Qualcomm
LTE for UMTS - OFDMA and SC-FDMA Based Radio Access,   Chapter 2.6: LTE Advanced for IMT-advanced, pp. 19–21.
 e,:-(editor), LTE and the Evolution to 4G Wireless: Design and Measurement Challenges, Agilent Technologies Publication 2009, Chapter 8.7: Proving LTE Advanced, p. 425.
, et al.; Nokia Siemens Networks; LTE Advanced: The Path towards Gigabit/s in Wireless Mobile Communications, Wireless VITAE'09.
  Mobile Terminal Receiver Design: LTE and LTE-Advanced , .

References

External links 
 LTE Advanced page on Qualcomm site
 3GPP Official 3GPP Standardisation Page on LTE Advanced
 Future use of LTE A femtocells 
 LTE-3GPP online decoders 3GPP LTE / LTE Advanced online L3 messages decoders (24.008, 44.018, 44.060, etc.) supporting Release 14

Resources (white papers, technical papers, application notes)
 LTE-Advanced Technology Introduction white paper summarizing improvements on LTE known as LTE-Advanced Release 10
 Introducing LTE-Advanced Application Note
 Introduction to LTE-Advanced Rel.11  summarization of improvements specified in LTE-Advanced Release 11

Japanese inventions
LTE (telecommunication)
Mobile technology
Telecommunications